Shams Charania (born April 1, 1994), is an American sports reporter for The Athletic and Stadium covering the NBA.

Early life 
Charania was born in Chicago to Pakistani parents who had immigrated to the U.S. in the 1980s. He was raised in Wilmette, Illinois and attended New Trier High School. He graduated from Loyola University Chicago.

Career 
He began his sportswriting career at age 17 covering the Chicago Bulls for ChicagoNow, a subsidiary of the Chicago Tribune. In 2012, Charania began writing for RealGM, and reporting small transactions around the league.

After several years, Charania caught the attention of Adrian Wojnarowski, then working for Yahoo Sports. After joining Yahoo, Charania began to break news of deals and high-profile signings in the summer of 2016, including Dwight Howard's move to the Atlanta Hawks, DeMar DeRozan's re-signing with the Toronto Raptors, Luol Deng's signing with the Los Angeles Lakers, and Jamal Crawford's signing with the Los Angeles Clippers. This set off a friendly rivalry between Wojnarowski and Charania. In 2017, Charania broke signings by Stephen Curry, Blake Griffin, Jeff Teague, and Paul Millsap.

On August 14, 2018, Shams announced via his Twitter account he would be leaving Yahoo Sports for The Athletic and Stadium at the end of the month.

On October 2, 2020, Charania reported that President Donald Trump and First Lady Melania Trump had tested positive for COVID-19.

References 

1994 births
American reporters and correspondents
American sports journalists
Living people
Loyola University Chicago alumni
People from Chicago
People from Wilmette, Illinois
American people of Pakistani descent